Sandy Martin is an American actress, playwright, director, and producer. She is best known for her roles in the film Napoleon Dynamite and the TV series Big Love, It's Always Sunny in Philadelphia, and Ray Donovan.

Career

Martin started her acting career at 15 years old; she is a founding member of several successful theatrical companies in New York City and Los Angeles. She adapted the screenplays of several theatrical plays, and served as associate producer of several TNT productions including the 1993 film Gettysburg.

Martin's television roles include playing Mickey Donovan's sister-in-law Sandy Patrick in Ray Donovan, elderly nun Sister Laura Marie  on Saving Grace, a policewoman in 48 Hrs., Mrs. Meredith in Real Genius, a dying burn victim in Nip/Tuck, Janice in Barfly, and Mrs. Mac in It's Always Sunny in Philadelphia. She appeared in the films Defenseless, China Moon, Speed, Napoleon Dynamite, Hot Tamale, and Marley & Me. Martin portrayed Grandma Dynamite in Napoleon Dynamite and in the animated TV adaptation of the film. In Marley & Me, Martin played the woman who sold Marley as "Clearance Puppy". Martin portrayed the mother of Sam Rockwell's character, Officer Dixon, in 2017's Three Billboards Outside Ebbing, Missouri.

Martin's recent roles include portraying Verna The Secretary in Dumbo. According to Martin, she met Dumbo director Tim Burton back in the Beetlejuice days because her friend, Glenn Shadix, played Otho in the film. The two reconnected after Ben Davis, director of photography for both Three Billboards Outside Ebbing, Missouri and Dumbo, suggested Martin to Burton for the role of Verna. Martin also voiced Grandma Paguro in the Pixar film Luca.

In the HBO series Big Love, Martin's character, Selma Green, is the transgender brother of polygamous cult leader Roman Grant and first wife of Grant's rival polygamous cult leader, Hollis Green. The character of Green sparked much discussion on fan forums due to their masculine gender presentation and expression, and unusual relationship with their husband (who refers to Green as "Brother Selma").

Filmography

Film

Television

References

External links

Sandy Martin Official Website

American film actresses
American television actresses
American voice actresses
20th-century American actresses
21st-century American actresses
Actresses from New York City
Actresses from Philadelphia
Living people
Year of birth missing (living people)